Egg Island is an island in the U.S. state of Georgia. It is located at the mouth of the Altamaha River, bordering the Atlantic Ocean. Egg Island is part of the Wolf Island National Wildlife Refuge.

Egg Island was so named for the many eggs left on the beaches by sea birds.

References

Islands of Georgia (U.S. state)
Islands of McIntosh County, Georgia
Coastal islands of Georgia (U.S. state)